Terry Allen Meiners (born January 22, 1957), is a radio and television personality on WHAS (AM) and WHAS-TV in Louisville, Kentucky. On radio, The Terry Meiners Show has aired weekday afternoons since 1985.

Meiners is known for broadcasting impersonations of prominent local citizens, and his satirical interviews of eclectic news figures, comedians, film and television stars, and politicians.
Meiners co-hosted Great Day Live (news, knowledge, and nonsense) for 8 years with news anchor Rachel Platt weekday mornings on WHAS-TV. 
Pat Forde, a veteran sportswriter and Louisville resident now with Sports Illustrated, has called Meiners "a skilled smart aleck, a local legend who is able to skewer almost everyone without making too many enemies."

Academy Award winner Jennifer Lawrence calls Meiners her "first celebrity friend" and claims that "Terry Meiners still makes me starstruck."

References

1957 births
Living people
Radio personalities from Louisville, Kentucky
St. Xavier High School (Louisville) alumni
Television personalities from Louisville, Kentucky
University of Kentucky alumni